Mansfield Central is a former railway station that served the town of Mansfield, Nottinghamshire.

History

The line, and its stations, was worked by the Great Central Railway and became part of the LNER in 1923 and subsequently British Railways in 1948.

Timetabled services ceased on 3 January 1956, though Summer weekend excursion traffic to Scarborough, Cleethorpes, Skegness and Mablethorpe continued until 8 September 1962.

The line through the station was closed on 7 January 1968 and subsequently lifted. The station and its associated earthworks were razed to the ground in 1972.

References

Sources

External links
Mansfield Central railway station on navigable 1947 O.S. Map npe Maps
Station, line and mileages (archived) at Railway Codes
Image of the old station at Flickr

Disused railway stations in Nottinghamshire
Former Great Central Railway stations
Railway stations in Great Britain opened in 1917
Railway stations in Great Britain closed in 1956
Buildings and structures in Mansfield